Kate Robin is an American playwright, television writer and producer, and screenwriter. She is currently the showrunner of One Mississippi created by and starring Tig Notaro on Amazon.

Career
Robin's recent theater productions include: I See You (the Flea), What They Have (South Coast Rep), Anon. (The Atlantic Theater Company), Intrigue with Faye (MCC Theater), The Light Outside (The Flea Theater), and Swimming in March (Market Theatre), which won the IRNE Award for Best Play of 2001. In 2003, Robin received the Princess Grace Award for playwriting and is an alumna for New Dramatists.

Robin joined the writing staff of Six Feet Under as the show's first female writer in 2001. In 2002, Robin was appointed Executive Story Editor and in 2003 became a producer. For the fifth and final season Robin was credited as a supervising producer. Robin has written 8 episodes for the series which include the season 2 finale, “The Last Time”, and the Season 5 premiere, “A Coat of White Primer”.

In Spring 2010, Robin worked as a consulting producer for the first season on NBC comedy-drama series Parenthood.

Robin served as co-executive producer of The Affair, a drama series which premiered on Showtime in October 2014. Robin has written two episodes.

The Affair episodes
 “5” (2014)
 “7” (2014)

Six Feet Under episodes
 “A Private Life” (2001)
 “The Plan” (2002)
 “The Last Time” (2002)
 “The Eye Inside” (2003)
 “The Opening” (2003)
 “Terror Starts at Home” (2004)
 “A Coat of White Primer” (2005)
 “All Alone” (2005)

References

External links
 

American screenwriters
American television producers
American women television producers
American television writers
Living people
American women screenwriters
American women television writers
Year of birth missing (living people)
American women dramatists and playwrights
21st-century American women